Beechmont, Kentucky may refer to:

Beechmont, Louisville, a neighborhood in Kentucky
Beechmont, Muhlenberg County, Kentucky, a census-designated place and unincorporated community